The 1899–1900 Scottish Division One season was won by Rangers by seven points over nearest rival Celtic.

League table

Results

References 

1899–1900 Scottish Football League
Scottish Division One seasons